Randolph Klaus Johnson (June 17, 1944 – September 17, 2009) was an American football player. He was the starting quarterback for the Atlanta Falcons in their inaugural season of 1966.  He also had brief careers with the New York Giants, Washington Redskins, and Green Bay Packers. In 1974, he played with The Hawaiians of the World Football League (WFL).

Born and raised in San Antonio, Texas, Johnson graduated from its Sam Houston High School in 1962. He played college football at  Texas A&I in Kingsville (now Texas A&M–Kingsville), teammates with guard Gene Upshaw.

Johnson is a member of the Texas A&M Kingsville Javelina Hall of Fame. A two time All-American in 1964 and 1965. He led the Javs in passing in all 4 years he played, and led the team in rushing in 1964. Johnson was the Lone Star Conference MVP in 1964 after leading the conference in passing. He was also the MVP in the 1965 Blue-Grey Classic, MVP in the Coaches All-America game and one of the top performers in the Senior Bowl.

Johnson entered the 1966 NFL Draft, and became the first Texas A&I player to ever be selected in the first round (16th overall). He was also selected in the 4th round of the AFL draft by the Denver Broncos. Over his professional career, he completed 647 of 1,286 passes (a 50.3-percentage) for 51 touchdowns and 90 interceptions. He also ran for 573 yards and 10 touchdowns over his career.

Johnson spent the later years of his life in seclusion. He died September 17, 2009, in Brevard, North Carolina.

References

External links
 
 World Football League players – Randy Johnson
 

1944 births
2009 deaths
American football quarterbacks
Atlanta Falcons players
Green Bay Packers players
New York Giants players
Texas A&M–Kingsville Javelinas football players
The Hawaiians players
Washington Redskins players
Players of American football from San Antonio